The Senior men's race at the 2015 IAAF World Cross Country Championships was held at the Guiyang horse racing circuit in Guiyang, China, on March 28, 2015.  Reports of the event were given for the IAAF.

Complete results for individuals, and for teams were published.

Race results

Senior men's race (12 km)

Individual

Teams

Note: Athletes in parentheses did not score for the team result.

Participation
According to an unofficial count, 110 athletes from 37 countries participated in the Senior men's race.

See also
 2015 IAAF World Cross Country Championships – Junior men's race
 2015 IAAF World Cross Country Championships – Senior women's race
 2015 IAAF World Cross Country Championships – Junior women's race

References

Senior men's race at the World Athletics Cross Country Championships
IAAF World Cross Country Championships